, also known as  is a former member of Dynamic Productions. He was born in 1952 in the island of Hokkaido. Tatsuo joined Dynamic in 1975. He is mostly known for being the co-creator of Kotetsu Jeeg along with Go Nagai, which was also Yasuda's debut. Other titles were also created by Nagai and him.

External links
 Tankōbon list of Tatsuo Yasuda at Dynamic Land webpage 
 Works list of Tatsuya Yasuda at BEN's homepage 

1952 births
Manga artists
People from Hokkaido
Living people